Bonnechere River Provincial Park is located along the Bonnechere River in southern Ontario, Canada. This scenic portion of the river is particularly suitable for canoe camping. It is a non-operating park, meaning no fees are charged and no staff are present with only a few services offered.

External links

Official Website of Friends of Bonnechere Parks

Parks in Renfrew County
Provincial parks of Ontario
Protected areas established in 1986
1986 establishments in Ontario